Shunsaku Okuda (born July 11, 1971) is the leader of the Japanese rock/pop band the brilliant green where he plays bass guitar and rhythm guitar and has composed the vast majority of the band's music. He also produces music under the pseudonyms Chiffon Brownie, Malibu Convertible, and Mark and John.

Personal life
On November 22, 2003 he married the brilliant green's lead singer, Tomoko Kawase.

Discography

With The Brilliant Green

 The Brilliant Green (1998)
 Terra 2001 (1999)
 Los Angeles (2001)
 The Winter Album (2002)
 Blackout (2010)

Production credits
 Tommy february6 (2002)
 Tommy Airline (2004)
 OH MY JULIET! (2005)
 Tommy heavenly6 (2005)
 Heavy Starry Heavenly (2007)
 I Kill My Heart (2009)
 february & heavenly (2012)
 Tommy Candy Shop Sugar Me (2013)

Concert tours
With The Brilliant Green 
 There Will Be Live There Tour (1998)
 Terra 2001 Tour (1999)

Backing band
 ''Heavy Starry Tour (2007)

References

External links
Official Site Warner Music Japan (Japanese)

1971 births
Japanese rock bass guitarists
Japanese composers
Japanese male composers
Living people
Musicians from Kyoto Prefecture
Musicians from Tokyo
People from Kyoto
Male bass guitarists
21st-century bass guitarists
21st-century Japanese male musicians